Hystrivasum squamosum is an extinct species of medium-sized fossil sea snail, a predatory marine gastropod in the family Turbinellidae.

References

 E. H. Vokes. 1966. The genus Vasum (Mollusca: Gastropoda) in the new world. Tulane Studies in Geology and Paleontology 5(1):1-35

Turbinellidae
Prehistoric gastropods
Gastropods described in 1971